Paulo Cézar Lima (born 16 June 1949), commonly known as Caju, is a Brazilian former professional footballer who played as an attacking midfielder. During his career, he played for various clubs in Brazil, most notably Botafogo, and for Marseille in France. At international level, he was capped 57 times by the Brazil national team in the 1960s and 1970s, scoring 10 goals.

Career
Caju spent his early years in Honduras, where his father Marinho Rodrigues managed Club Deportivo Olimpia during the early 1960s. In the mid-1960s Marinho took over as manager in Colombian club Junior de Barranquilla, where Caju debuted as a professional, at age 16, playing alongside Brazilian internationals Dida and Escurinho.

In 1967 he moved to Botafogo de Futebol e Regatas, making his debut at age 17. He won the Campeonato Carioca (championship of the state of Rio de Janeiro) several times and many more trophies which led him to become one of Botafogo de Futebol e Regatas' all-time greatest and most honoured players.

Caju was most widely known as a member of the Brazilian national team in the World Cup in 1970 and in 1974. With the Brazilian national team he collected 57 caps and 10 goals.

Caju featured in the Brazilian Bola de Ouro team of the season in Brazil in the seasons 1970, 1972, 1976, 1977.

In the 1990s, Paulo César Lima was the subject of a documentary film by João Moreira Salles  The documentary depicts his flamboyance on and off the field during his days as a football player, and the difficult adjustments he had to make afterwards, outside of the limelight, and surviving on his income as a landlord.

Clubs
1966–1967 Junior de Barranquilla -Colombia
1967–1972 Botafogo de Futebol e Regatas
1972–1974 Clube de Regatas do Flamengo
1974–1975 Olympique de Marseille
1975–1977 Fluminense Football Club
1977–1978 Botafogo de Futebol e Regatas
1978–1979 Grêmio Foot-Ball Porto Alegrense
1980 Club de Regatas Vasco da Gama
1981 Sport Club Corinthians Paulista
1982–1983 AS Aix
1983 Grêmio Foot-Ball Porto Alegrense

Honours

Botafogo
 Campeonato Brasileiro Série A: 1968
 Campeonato Carioca: 1967 and 1968

Flamengo
 Campeonato Carioca: 1972 and 1974

Fluminense
 Campeonato Carioca: 1975 and 1976
 Tournoi de Paris: 1976
 Teresa Herrera Trophy: 1977

Grêmio
 Campeonato Gaúcho: 1979 and 1980
 Copa Intercontinental: 1983

Vasco da Gama
 Trofeo Colombino: 1980

Brazil
 FIFA World Cup: 1970
 Roca Cup: 1971
 Brazil Independence Cup: 1972

Personal titles
 Brazilian Bola de Prata (Placar): 1970, 1972, 1976, 1977
 Rio state league's top scorer: 1971

References and footnotes

Footballers from Rio de Janeiro (city)
Brazilian footballers
Brazil international footballers
Brazilian expatriate footballers
1970 FIFA World Cup players
FIFA World Cup-winning players
1974 FIFA World Cup players
Botafogo de Futebol e Regatas players
Sport Club Corinthians Paulista players
CR Flamengo footballers
Fluminense FC players
Grêmio Foot-Ball Porto Alegrense players
Olympique de Marseille players
CR Vasco da Gama players
California Surf players
Expatriate footballers in France
Expatriate soccer players in the United States
Campeonato Brasileiro Série A players
North American Soccer League (1968–1984) players
Ligue 1 players
Brazilian expatriate sportspeople in France
Brazilian expatriate sportspeople in the United States
1949 births
Living people
Association football forwards
Pays d'Aix FC players